The 1920 United States Senate election in Louisiana was held on November 2, 1920. Incumbent Senator Edward J. Gay did not run for re-election.

On September 14, Edwin S. Broussard won the Democratic primary with 45.74% of the vote. 

At this time, Louisiana was a one-party state, and the Democratic nomination was tantamount to victory. Broussard won the November general election without an opponent.

Democratic primary

Candidates
Edwin S. Broussard, Progressive candidate for Lt. Governor in 1916 and brother of former Senator Robert F. Broussard
Donelson Caffery III, Populist candidate for Governor in 1900 and son of former Senator Donelson Caffery
Jared Y. Sanders Sr., U.S. Representative from Franklin and former Governor of Louisiana

Results

General election

References

1920
Louisiana
United States Senate
Single-candidate elections